The PuSh International Performing Arts Festival is produced over three weeks each January in Vancouver, British Columbia. The PuSh Festival presents work in the live performing arts.

The Festival showcases international, Canadian and local artists.

Administration 

Norman Armour is the Artistic & Executive director of the PuSh International Performing Arts Festival. Armour is a co-founder of the PuSh Festival.

Past Festivals

2003 Foundation 
The PuSh Festival was co-founded in 2003 by Katrina Dunn of Touchstone Theatre and Norman Armour of Rumble Productions.

2005 PuSh Festival 
In 2005, the organization of the Festival was formalized with the creation of a formal board of directors and advisors and by being registered as a charitable organization.

2008 PuSh Festival 
The 2008 PuSh Festival had over 23,000 attendees. Visiting presenters from across Canada and around the world were in attendance for the PuSh Assembly networking event to view performances, network, and experience the Festival.

2009 PuSh Festival 
The 2009 PuSh Festival took place from January 20 to February 8, and offered works from across Canada, England, Japan and New Zealand. A total of 136 performances took place at 16 venues across the city and the attendance was more than 24,000.

2012 PuSh Festival 
The 2012 PuSh Festival took place from January 16 to February 4, and offered works from Canada, the United States, the United Kingdom, Spain, Japan, Lebanon, New Zealand, Argentina, the Netherlands, and Mexico. There were over 160 performances and events across 14 venues, of which 31 were sold out. Attendance was over 23,000.

2013 PuSh Festival 
The 2013 PuSh Festival took place from January 15 to February 3, and offered works from Argentina, Belgium, Canada, Denmark, England, France, Germany Japan, Scotland, Taiwan, and the United States. There were over 190 performances and events across 16 venues, of which 44 were sold out. Attendance was over 34,000.

2014 PuSh Festival 
The 2014 PuSh Festival took place January 14 to February 2, and offered works from Canada, England, Germany, Ireland, Lebanon, Portugal, and the United States. There were over 150 performances and events across 15 venues, including the Vancouver Playhouse, SFU Woodwards and the York Theatre. Feature events included the 10th Anniversary Opening Gala performance and party; 20 Main Stage shows spanning theatre, dance, music and multimedia performance; 17 PuSh Conversations with artists pre- and post-performances; three weeks of startling, experimental performances at Club PuSh; a film series; the PuSh Assembly for arts industry; Patrons Circle donor events; and dinner/theatre packages with Dine Out Vancouver. In 2014, PuSh Festival hosted two Artists-in-Residence in partnership with grunt gallery and the Contemporary Art Gallery (Vancouver) for the first time. The international visiting artists Rabih Mroué of Lebanon and Tim Etchells of England were invited to present their work which crossed visual, theatre and literary forms.

Total attendance numbers reached almost 24,000, with an average house capacity of 79% for performances and 37 sold-out events. The Festival sold out 400 PuSh passes to loyal PuSh patrons by the end of December and launched its inaugural PuSh Youth Passport program, allowing 266 young people aged 16 to 24 to see select performances for discounted ticket prices.

The 2014 Accessible PuSh program issued 375 tickets to community groups to attend performances for free.

A dedicated roster of over 181 volunteers worked more than 2,400 hours in support of the Festival.

2015 PuSh Festival 
The 2015 PuSh International Performing Arts Festival took place January 20 to February 8, and offered works from Argentina, Australia, Belgium, Canada, Czech Republic, Democratic Republic of the Congo, France, Germany, the Netherlands, Norway, Scotland, and the United States. There were over 250 performances and events across 17 venues, of which over 90 were sold out. Attendance was over 28,000.

2016 PuSh Festival 
The 2016 PuSh International Performing Arts Festival took place January 19 to February 7, and offered works from 7 countries. There were 250 performances and events across 17 venues, of which 125 were sold out. Attendance was over 23,000. The Artist-in-Residence was Jordan Tannahill.

2017 PuSh Festival 
The 2017 PuSh International Performing Arts Festival took place January 16 to February 5. There were 200 performances and events across 18 venues, of which 97 were sold out. Attendance was over 22,500.

2018 PuSh Festival 
The 2018 PuSh International Performing Arts Festival took place January 16 to February 4, and featured 96 Canadian artists and 79 International artists. There were 150 performances and events across 18 venues over 20 days.

2019 PuSh Festival 
The next edition of the PuSh International Performing Arts Festival is scheduled to take place January 17 to February 3, 2019. The Artist-in-Residence is The Biting School.

References 

Theatre festivals in British Columbia
Festivals in Vancouver
Theatre in Vancouver
Recurring events established in 2003
2003 establishments in British Columbia